Muslim Gamzatovich Gadzhimagomedov (born 14 January 1997) is a Russian professional boxer. As an amateur, Gadzhimagomedov won a gold medal at the 2019 World Championships and 2019 European Games. Gadzhimagomedov also won silver medals at both the 2020 Summer Olympics and 2017 European Championships.

Amateur career

Olympic result
Tokyo 2020
Round of 16: Defeated Abdelhafid Benchabla (Algeria) 5–0
Quarter-finals: Defeated Ammar Abduljabbar (Germany) 5–0
Semi-finals: Defeated David Nyika (New Zealand) 4–1
Final: Defeated by Julio César La Cruz (Cuba) 5–0

World Championship results
Hamburg 2017
First round: Defeated Jeysson Monroy (Colombia) 5–0
Round of 16: Defeated by Bektemir Melikuziev (Uzbekistan) 4–1

Yekaterinburg 2019 
Round of 32: Defeated Berat Acar (Turkey) 5–0
Round of 16: Defeated David Nyika (New Zealand) 5–0
Quarter-finals: Defeated Cheavon Clarke (England) 5–0
Semi–finals: Defeated Radoslav Pantaleev (Bulgaria) 5–0
Final: Defeated Julio Castillo (Ecuador) 5–0

European Games result
Minsk 2019
Round of 16: Defeated Victor Schelstraete (Belgium) 5–0
Quarter-finals: Defeated Aziz Mouhiidine (Italy) 5–0
Semi–finals: Defeated Toni Filipi (Croatia) 5–0
Final: Defeated Uladzislau Smiahlikau (Belarus) 5–0

Professional career

Early career
Gadzhimagomedov made his professional debut on 24 December 2021 against Deibis Berrocal. Gadzhimagomedov won by knockout after knocking his opponent down three times in the second round.

Professional boxing record

References

External links

1997 births
Living people
Russian male boxers
Light-heavyweight boxers
Heavyweight boxers
AIBA World Boxing Championships medalists
Boxers at the 2019 European Games
European Games medalists in boxing
European Games gold medalists for Russia
Boxers at the 2020 Summer Olympics
Olympic medalists in boxing
Medalists at the 2020 Summer Olympics
Olympic boxers of Russia
People from Tlyaratinsky District
Sportspeople from Dagestan
20th-century Russian people
21st-century Russian people